Riley of the Rainbow Division is a 1928 American silent war comedy film directed by Bobby Ray and starring Creighton Hale, Al Alt and Pauline Garon. In Britain, it was released under the alternative title of Flappers in Khaki.

Synopsis
Following America's entry into World War I, two friends enlist as doughboys. However, their fiancées decide they want to marry them before they go off to war and enter their training camp in disguise. They end up accompanying them to Europe where they become embroiled with German spies.

Cast
 Creighton Hale as Riley 
 Al Alt as Henry Graham 
 Pauline Garon as Gertie Bowers 
 Joan Standing as Mabel 
 Jack Carlyle as Sgt. McMullen 
 Lafe McKee
 Rolfe Sedan
 Jack Raymond

References

Bibliography
 Munden, Kenneth White. The American Film Institute Catalog of Motion Pictures Produced in the United States, Part 1. University of California Press, 1997.

External links

1928 films
1928 comedy films
Silent American comedy films
Films directed by Bobby Ray
American silent feature films
1920s English-language films
American black-and-white films
American World War I films
1920s American films